Adelaide Tosi ( – 27 March 1859) was an Italian operatic soprano.

Born in Milan, Tosi studied singing with Girolamo Crescentini. She made her professional debut in her native city on 26 December 1820, singing Ippolito in Simon Mayr's Fedra. On 12 March 1822 she portrayed Azema in the premiere of Giacomo Meyerbeer's L'esule di Granata at La Scala. Her debut in Naples was on 29 September 1824 at the Teatro di San Carlo in the premiere of Giovanni Pacini's Alessandro nelle Indie. On 7 April 1828, she portrayed Bianca in Vincenzo Bellini's Bianca e Fernando for the grand opening of the Teatro Carlo Felice in Genoa. She returned to that house later that season to sing Pamira in Gioachino Rossini's Le siège de Corinthe. She went on to portray roles in three world premieres of operas by Gaetano Donizetti in Naples: Argelia in L'esule di Roma (1828), Neala in Il paria (1829), and Elisabetta in Il castello di Kenilworth (1829). Tosi was married to Count Ferdinando Lucchesi Palli and had two children with him: daughter Clotilde and son Febo Edoardo. She died in Naples in 1859.

References
Notes

Sources
Ashbrook, William (1982), Donizetti and His Operas, Cambridge University Press. 
La Belle Assemblée ("Memoir of Tosi"). Vol. XV, London: Edward Bull, 1832.

Italian operatic sopranos
1800 births
1859 deaths
19th-century Italian women opera singers
Singers from Milan